is a professional Japanese baseball player.

External links

 NPB.com

1990 births
Living people
Baseball people from Miyazaki Prefecture
Japanese baseball players
Nippon Professional Baseball pitchers
Tokyo Yakult Swallows players